Alma Redlinger (March 8, 1924 – February 2, 2017) was a painter and illustrator from Romania.

"Alma Redlinger has built a forward-looking career in its essence from the beginning. High-value, the artist's work proves an  exceptional consistency and it is an example for those who have chosen art as a destiny. Alma Redlinger is part of artists generation which assure the continuity of interwar painting and contemporary painting." Octavian Barbosa, 1976

Studies

She studied at the Academy of art school free Maxy, between 1940 and 1944, and in 1945 at the Academy of Art Guguianu, with the teacher and painter M.H. Maxy. She was a member of the Artists Union in Bucharest from 1951. From 1945 she exhibited at graphic painting salons and then at state art exhibitions. After 1969 she participated in decorative art exhibitions and monumental art works executed in 1959–1961, 1964.

Personal exhibitions

1956, 1961, 1967 – Painting, Magheru B. Gallery
1970, 1975, 1978, 2002, 2004 – Painting, Simeza Gallery
1976 – Drawings, Theatre Tăndărică,  Victoria Hall
1983, 1987, 1991 – Painting and Graphics,  Orizont Gallery
1994 – Painting and Graphics, National Theatre, Bucharest
1998 – Graphics, Art House, Bucharest
1998 – Graphics, Club Junimea, Museum of Romanian Literature, Iași
2000 – Painting, Crown Plaza, Bucharest
2000 – Painting and Graphics,  Frezia Gallery, Dej
2006 – "Atelier", Painting and Graphics, Veroniki Art Gallery, Bucharest
2007 – Military National Circle Gallery, Bucharest
2009 – Ana Gallery, Bucharest
2011 – Painting and Mixed Graphics, Dalles Hall Bucharest
2011 – Painting and Mixed Graphics Suceava History Museum

Group exhibitions
1953 – World Youth Exhibition
1959–1960 Collective exhibition Belarus, Minsk, and Athens
1965 – Internationale Buchkunstausstellung, Leipzing
1971 – 3rd International Bienniale of sport art, Madrid
1973 – The 4th International Bienniale of Sport, Madrid
1973 – Estampe contemporaine, National Library, Paris
1977 – International Exhibition of Romanian fine arts, Helsinki
1981 – Miro International Art Exhibition, Barcelona
1981 – George Enescu reverential exhibition, Bacau	
1982 – Romanian Art Exhibition, Vienna
1984 – Intregraphik Berlin
1986 – Nicolae Tonitza reverential exhibition, Barlad
1987 –  Luchian reverential exhibition, Botoșani
1988 – Romanian contemporary graphics
1991 – Romanian graphics, Israel
1994 – Romanian Art Exhibition in China
2003 – Contemporary Romanian Art   in Italy
2003 – Judische Kunst, Montabaur, Germania
2005 – Alma Redlinger "After 60 years," Allianz Tiriac Gallery

Prizes
 1945 – Anastase Simu Award;
 1946 – Award of Fine Arts Ministry;
 1959 – Mention of Mondial Festival of Youth;
 1985 – Gold Medal of "Academia d'Italia delle Arti e delle Lavoro"
 1985 – "Oscar d'Italia";
 2004 – Order "Meritul cultural".
 2006 – "Marcel Iancu award for Fine Arts
 2011 – "Nihil Sine Deo" Medal offered by Michael of Romania

Works in museums and collections-selection
 National Museum of Art of Romania,
 Bacau Art Museum,
 Timișoara Art Museum,
 Iasi Art Museum
 Galati Art Museum
 Art collection of the Royal House of Romania

About Alma Redlinger
"The one that walks the halls of Alma Redlinger exhibition, is fascinated from the first moment of the safety, the vigor and the authority expression of this artist. The figure, a force that is given only by the synthesis ability, gives greatness to some works that are not exceeding a few tens of centimeters.
Two or three flat color patches give works relief, and the viewer the feeling that everything that had to be said was said. No unnecessary detail, any element "for beauty" does not disturb these images, which remain in memory long after you've seen it. In painting, drawing or collage, in the final works or drawings, Alma Redlinger is the same sober and personal artist, foreign to attractive show or complacent.
In earlier paintings, compositions, still life and flowers, cubist severity intuition has made its mark. By the 70s, or even earlier, when others were trying to find Cubism, Alma Redlinger was already doing synthesis in this spirit (...)" Radu Ionescu

(...) During a life time dedicated to creation, Alma Redlinger has built an unmistakable style. Modernism, part of the plastic idiom circulated in her paintings, has deep roots, "which come from far away". The creative solutions of cubism, of the constructivism, of the expressionism and fauvism were deposited in plastic structures proposed by Alma Redlinger, like the pearl in the sea shell. In this way, of cultural assimilation, the above-mentioned solutions provides reasoning and preciousness for the paintings thatwe already admired for a long time. Above all, we like tense dialogue, polemical, yet not without a secret threat waged between graphical and chromatic structures ... Her painting style has built, I think, as a result of this strategy of delay, of the orpheic"taming" of image sources themselves. So that the drawing gestural "clamour" almost always seeks its haven in solemn sounds of purple, or of the green which borrowed the effect of forest mossvelvet, as in a neighbor canvas, the chromatic "clamour" is fixed, as the alchemical mercury in the design of stained glass network. Alma Redlinger is the silent chronicler, patient and inspiring of this tournament without end. Following the creative effort, she manages to capture and tell us essential sequences of a perpetual genesis, during which the image occurs. Cristian Robert Velescu

(...)On March 16, at the Dalles hall, took place the exhibition of Alma Redlinger. The visitoris found from the entrance, under the impact of the images, impressed by the magnitude and beauty that the figures shapes or objects included in her compositions gets. There is a self-portrait in the exhibition from 2010.The movement full of enthusiasm of the author seems to cause, through the simpleact of painting, a real earthquake of the surrounding forms, imposing unexpected pitches or displacements, like a monarch who prints his will over his empire (in this case the painted canvas). Each work is a reversal " of public order ", through plans synthesis and their unexpected blend, by highlighting their key directions, their way to meet and separate. The stunning range of floral images completes the great vitality image of artist vision, by the power of transforming small items in essential cells of existence. Here, as in her large figurative compositions, the welding between objects and environment, is transformed into a unitary structure, a larger structure cell. Yvonne Hasan

Notes

Bibliography

 Dicționarul artistilor români contemporani – Octavian BARBOSA – Editura Meridiane – 1976/Octavian Barbosa, Dictionary of contemporary Romanian artists, Meridians House, Bucharest, 1976;
 Ideé et sensibilité – Dan GRIGORESCU – L'art roumain contamporain – direction et tendence – Édition Meridiane – 1991;
 Album Alma Redlinger, Editura Master Print, 2009, album îngrijit de Daria Simion și Vasile Petrovici
 Enciclopedia artiștilor români contemorani – Vasile FLOREA, s.a. – editura ARC 2000
 Claus Stephani: Ziehtochter der Avantgarde. Alma Redlinger hat rumänische Kunsttradition über den Sozialistischen Realismus herübergerettet. In: Kulturpolitische Korrespondenz (Bonn), no. 1155, 10.9.2002, p. 21-22 
 Revista AnticArtMagazin, aprilie, 2007 pag.24,25, număr dedicat artistei Alma Redlinger
 Maria-Magdalena CRISAN, Observator Cultural 13-19 iulie 2006, nr. 329
 Catalogul Expozitiei Alma Redlinger, Galeria Cercului Militar National, Bucuresti, 2007/Exhibition catalog Alma Redlinger, Military National Circle Gallery, Bucharest, 2007
 Alma Redlinger, Dicționar de artă modernă și contemporană, Constantin Prut (ediție imbunătățită) Ed. Univers Enciclopedic 2002/Alma Redlinger, Dictionary of modern and contemporary art, Constantin Prut (updated edition) Edited by Encyclopedic Universe 2002
 Alma Redlinger,  Lexiconul: Pictori, Sculptori și Desenatori români, de Mircea Deac, Ed. Medro
 Alma Redlinger,  Catalogul Expoziției "Atelier", Galeria Veroniki Art, București, 2006
 Alma Redlinger, Albumul Atelierul Internațional de creație Feminină Contemporană,  Editura A. I. C. F. C. 2008
 Alma Redlinger, Catalogul Expoziției personale de pictură, Galeria Artelor, Cercul Militar Național, București, 2007/Exhibition catalogue of Alma Redlinger, Military National Circle Gallery, Bucharest, 2007;
 Claus Stephani: Das Bild des Juden in der modernen Malerei. Eine Einführung. / Imaginea evreului în pictura modernă. Studiu introductiv. Traducere în limba română de Ion Peleanu. (Zweisprachige Ausgabe, deutsch-rumänisch. Ediţie bilingvă, româno-germană.) Editura Hasefer: București, 2005. 
 Catalogul Expoziției Alma Redlinger, Sala Dalles, București, Editura UNARTE, 2011, curator Adrian Buga/Alma Redlinger Exhibition Catalogue, Dalles Hall, Bucharest, Edited by UNARTE, 2011 curator Adrian Buga

External links
 https://www.almaredlinger.com/
 Alma Redlinger-pictând https://www.youtube.com/watch?v=dlEDUhKPYRo
 http://www.adevarul.ro/cultura/Alma-Redlinger-batranete-intinerit-pictura_0_57596267.html
 https://web.archive.org/web/20120405135918/http://www.curierulnational.ro/Specializat/2010-03-10/Alma+Redlinger+-+Secretul+perenitatii
 https://web.archive.org/web/20120405135938/http://www.curierulnational.ro/Specializat/2010-02-10/Alma+Redlinger
 http://www.stdb.ro/~vasile/muzeua.htm
 http://www.patzeltart.ro/v/REDLINGER+ALMA/dar/
 http://www.sensotv.ro/arte/Clipa-de-arta-1884/alma-redlinger#/0
 http://www.klug-art.info 

1924 births
2017 deaths
Romanian painters
Romanian illustrators
Romanian women painters
Romanian women illustrators
Artists from Bucharest